is a Japanese cell biologist specializing in autophagy, the process that cells use to destroy and recycle cellular components. Ohsumi is a professor at Tokyo Institute of Technology's Institute of Innovative Research. He received the Kyoto Prize for Basic Sciences in 2012, the 2016 Nobel Prize in Physiology or Medicine, and the 2017 Breakthrough Prize in Life Sciences for his discoveries of mechanisms for autophagy.

Biography 

Ohsumi was born on February 9, 1945, in Fukuoka. He received a B.Sci. in 1967 and a D.Sci. in 1974, both from the University of Tokyo. In 1974–77 he was a postdoctoral fellow at the Rockefeller University in New York City.

He returned to the University of Tokyo in 1977 as a research associate; he was appointed Lecturer there in 1986, and promoted to Associate Professor in 1988. In 1996, he moved to the National Institute for Basic Biology, Japan in Okazaki City, where he was appointed as a professor. From 2004 to 2009, he was also professor at the Graduate University for Advanced Studies in Hayama. In 2009, he transitioned to a three-way appointment as an emeritus professor at the National Institute for Basic Biology and at the Graduate University for Advanced Studies, and a professorship at the Advanced Research Organization, Integrated Research Institute, Tokyo Institute of Technology (Tokyo Tech). After his retirement in 2014, he continued to serve as Professor at Institute of Innovative Research, Tokyo Institute of Technology. Currently, he is head of the Cell Biology Research Unit, Institute of Innovative Research, Tokyo Institute of Technology.

Christian de Duve coined the term autophagy in 1963 whereas Ohsumi began his work in 1988. Prior to that time, less than 20 papers per year were published on this subject. During the 1990s, Ohsumi's group described the morphology of autophagy in yeast, and performed mutational screening on yeast cells that identified essential genes for cells to be capable of autophagy.

In 2016, he was awarded the Nobel Prize in Physiology or Medicine "for his discoveries of mechanisms for autophagy". He is the 25th Japanese person to be awarded a Nobel Prize. Ohsumi's spouse Mariko, a Professor of Teikyo University of Science, collaborated on his research. She is a co-author of many academic papers with him.

Recognition 

Source:

2005 – Fujihara Award, Fujihara Foundation of Science
2006 – Japan Academy Prize, Japan Academy
2007 – Science Award, 
2008 – Asahi Prize, Asahi Shimbun
2012 – Kyoto Prize in Basic Sciences
2013 – Thomson Reuters Citation Laureate
2015 – Gairdner Foundation International Award
2015 – International Prize for Biology
2015 – Keio Medical Science Prize
2015 – Person of Cultural Merit
2015 – Rosenstiel Award
2016 – Wiley Prize in Biomedical Sciences
2016 – Dr. Paul Janssen Award for Biomedical Research
2016 – Nobel Prize in Physiology or Medicine
2017 – Breakthrough Prize in Life Sciences

Selected publications 

His original findings about autophagy in yeast cells:

Follow up with more research on yeast:

Others

See also 
List of Japanese Nobel laureates
List of Nobel laureates affiliated with the University of Tokyo

References

External links 
  inclkuding the Nobel Lecture December 7, 2016 Molecular Mechanisms of Autophagy in Yeast

Cell biologists
Japanese biologists
Nobel laureates in Physiology or Medicine
Academic staff of the University of Tokyo
Academic staff of Tokyo Institute of Technology
1945 births
Living people
People from Fukuoka
Kyoto laureates in Basic Sciences
University of Tokyo alumni
Persons of Cultural Merit
Members of the European Molecular Biology Organization
Japanese Nobel laureates
Recipients of the Order of Culture